Mohammed Al-Moeini (Arabic:محمد المعيني) (born 1 August 1986) is an Emirati footballer. He currently plays as a left back .

External links

References

Emirati footballers
1986 births
Living people
Sharjah FC players
Dubai CSC players
Al Ahli Club (Dubai) players
Al-Nasr SC (Dubai) players
Dibba FC players
Al Dhafra FC players
Al-Ittihad Kalba SC players
Al Urooba Club players
Al Hamriyah Club players
UAE First Division League players
UAE Pro League players
Association football fullbacks